Tengku Mohamad bin Tengku Abdul Aziz is the descendant of Sultan Hussein Shah, the 18th Sultan of Johor and the current Head of House of Singapore.

He was married at Istana Kampong Glam, Singapore on 1 November 1991 to Cik Saadah binti Haji Othman. He has a son, Tengku Bahrullah bin Tengku Mohamad, and a daughter, Tengku Zakiyah binti Tengku Mohamad.

Ancestry

References

1968 births
Singaporean people of Malay descent
Living people
Singaporean Muslims